Tora Aasland  (born 6 November 1942, in Skien) is a Norwegian politician for the Socialist Left Party. She served as the Minister of Research and Higher Education from 18 October 2007 to 23 March 2012. She was a member of the Norwegian Parliament, representing Akershus, from 1985 to 1993. From 1991 to 2013, she served as the County Governor of Rogaland.

Aasland was a deputy member of the executive committee of Nesodden municipality council during the terms 1975–1979 and 1979–1983. 

Aasland has a cand.sociol. degree in sociology and was a researcher at the Norwegian Institute for Social Research from 1976 to 1982, and its acting director from 1980 to 1981. She has cited Vilhelm Aubert as her largest influence.

References

External links 

Regjeringen.no - C.V.

1942 births
Living people
Socialist Left Party (Norway) politicians
Members of the Storting
Norwegian sociologists
Norwegian women sociologists
20th-century Norwegian politicians
Politicians from Skien